Pedro Otto Bumbel (6 July 1914 – 2 August 1998) was a Brazilian professional football player and coach who managed a number of Spanish club sides, including Sabadell, Valencia, Racing de Santander, Elche, Sevilla, Atlético Madrid and Málaga.

Before moving to Spain, Bumbel was active in Costa Rica with Saprissa, guiding the club to their first ever Primera División league title during the 1952–53 season.

Managerial Honours 
Deportivo Saprissa
Primera División de Costa Rica: 1953 

Atletico Madrid
Copa del Generalísimo: 1964-65

References

1914 births
1998 deaths
Brazilian people of German descent
Brazilian footballers
CR Flamengo footballers
Sport Club Corinthians Paulista players
Brazilian football managers
Brazilian expatriate football managers
Expatriate football managers in Spain
Deportivo Saprissa managers
Costa Rica national football team managers
Guatemala national football team managers
Honduras national football team managers
FC Porto managers
Valencia CF managers
Racing de Santander managers
Elche CF managers
Sevilla FC managers
Atlético Madrid managers
CD Málaga managers
RCD Mallorca managers
CE Sabadell FC managers
Racing de Ferrol managers
Expatriate football managers in Costa Rica
Expatriate football managers in Guatemala
Expatriate football managers in Honduras
Brazilian expatriate sportspeople in Costa Rica
Brazilian expatriate sportspeople in Guatemala
Brazilian expatriate sportspeople in Honduras
Brazilian expatriate sportspeople in Spain
Association football midfielders